Kangaroo: A Love-Hate Story is an Australian environmental documentary produced by Second Nature Films, co-written and directed by the team of Mick McIntyre and Kate McIntyre Clere. The documentary centres around the relationship that Australians share with kangaroos. The documentary includes experts on different sides of the issue, and features interviews with Tim Flannery and Terri Irwin, owner of the Australia Zoo. The film opened in Australia on 5 February 2017 and in 2018 Kangaroo opened in limited release in the United States on 19 January.

Background 
Kangaroo began as an interest to delve deeper into the split opinion concerning the animal, with McIntyre Clere saying that they were surprised to learn just how many kangaroos are shot and sold for profit each year.

The film opens in the middle of the action, with home video that was shot and provided by one of the interviewees in the film, showing the violent and brutal shooting of kangaroos on the edge of the individual's property. Kangaroos are seen as the icon of Australia, and the marsupial is featured in everything from tourism advertisements, sports teams, and Qantas, the national airline of Australia. The crux of the documentary is to shed light on the dark and violent truth that lies within the commercial kangaroo industry, and highlights the culling of the icon.

The film includes graphic scenes with the aftermath of kangaroo harvesting, explaining that while there are regulations put in place to ensure that the kangaroos are killed in a humane way (a bullet to the head), it is revealed that a sizeable percentage of culled kangaroos were shot in the neck or the jaw, rather than the head, causing prolonged suffering. Another important point in the film is that the systemic algorithm used to track and monitor kangaroo populations, is complicated and flawed as it does include factors such as drought, illegal shooting, climate change or slow reproduction rates. Kangaroo includes opinions from all sides of the issue, including those from a political and economic perspective, as well as from a humanitarian and scientific perspective, interviewing members of Australian parliament and environmental experts.

Cast 
Due to the documentary nature of the film, the cast does not feature a list of characters, but rather a list of credible sources who lent their time and expertise to appear in the film. Listed here are some of the featured Australians that were interviewed.

Reception 
The film received a mix of critical reviews when it first premiered. Many have been in positive support of the film, with the New York Times saying that film's makers "sound a wake-up siren" and that the film "isn't always pretty, but it is necessary." Variety had positive comments, praising the documentary, and noting that it "has the potential to help bring kangaroo welfare and management into much sharper focus in Australia and internationally," if a solution to the slaughter was to ever be found. Others, however, did not receive the film positively, especially farmers and those working in the commercial kangaroo industry, saying that the documentary was a "beat up" and expressed fears that it could ruin the industry. Kangaroo currently holds a score of 78% on Rotten Tomatoes and a score of 66 on Metacritic.

Controversy 
Due to the main content of the film, Kangaroo generated controversy. The topic of the film, the dark reality behind the kangaroo culling industry, was already controversial before the documentary was made, with Mick and Kate stating that they were shocked at how polarising the documentary was, saying that they "knew it would be polarising, but not this polarising." Those in government positions, as well as those who make a living in the commercial kangaroo industry, criticised the film. When NSW Greens senator Lee Rhiannon, one of the politicians featured in the documentary, spoke at one of the premieres with several other animal activists, her support and promotion of the film were labelled as "disgusting" by the minister of Federal Agriculture, David Littleproud. A negative reaction was also received from the National Farmers' Federation and its president, Fiona Simson, who criticised the documentary for "misrepresenting the situation," and "ignoring basic facts," claiming that the film was "very damaging to Australia." Other farmers and meat processors were critical, declaring that Kangaroo uses "shock tactics" and that the film was a complete joke, questioning the motives of the filmmakers.

Awards 

While Kangaroo had met the minimum requirements to be submitted for consideration for a 2019 Academy Award nomination, and the creators did launch a "For Your Consideration" advertising campaign in an effort to catch the academy's interest, the film did not receive a nomination, nor was it a shortlisted finalist.

Accolades 
 Marché Du Film Festival De Cannes (2017) – Special Screening
 Wildlife Film Festival: Rotterdam (2017) – Official Selection
 International Wildlife Film Festival (2018) – Featured Film
 Colorado Environmental Film Festival (2018) – Featured Viewing
 Oz Film Festival (2018) – Featured Documentary

See also 
Aussie Rules the World

References

External links 
 
 Official website

2017 films
Australian documentary films
Nature films
Films about kangaroos and wallabies
2010s English-language films